Songadh fort is a 16th-century fort in Songadh town of Tapi district, Gujarat, India. The fort gots its name from the Gujarati language terms son (gold) and gadh (fort). It is located near the Tapi River Ukai Dam at an elevation of 112 meters above sea level.

History

It was built by Pillaji Rao Gaekwad between 1721 to 1766. It is built on top of the high hill as a vantage point to keep an eye on enemies.

Architecture
Evidence of the influence of both Mughals and Marathas can be seen in the architecture of this fort.

Transport
It can be reached by approaching Songadh town on National Highway-6.

Tourist attraction
The fort is developed as a tourist attraction by the Songadh local authority and the district authorities. A lake was created and a dam was constructed as a part of developing the tourist spot.

References

Forts in Gujarat
Tapi district